"Viy", also translated as "The Viy", is a horror novella by the writer Nikolai Gogol, first published in volume 2 of his collection of tales entitled Mirgorod (1835).

Despite an author's note alluding to folklore, the title character is generally conceded to be wholly Gogol's invention.

Plot summary 
Students at Bratsky Monastery in Kyiv break for summer vacation. The impoverished students must find food and lodging along their journey home. They stray from the high road at the sight of a farmstead, hoping its cottagers would provide them.

A group of three, the kleptomaniac theologian Khalyava, the merry-making philosopher Khoma Brut, and the younger-aged rhetorician Tiberiy Gorobets, attracted by a false target of wheat fields suggesting a nearby village, must walk extra distance before finally reaching a farm with two cottages, as night drew near. The old woman begrudgingly lodges the three travelers separately.

At night, the woman calls on Khoma, and begins grabbing at him. This is no amorous embrace; the flashy-eyed woman leaps on his back and rides him like a horse. When she broom-whips him, his legs begin to motion beyond his control. He sees the black forest part before them, and realizes she is a witch (ved'ma). He is strangely envisioning himself galloping over the surface of a glass-mirror like sea: he sees his own reflection in it, and the grass grows deep underneath; he bears witness to a sensually naked water-nymph (rusalka).

By chanting prayers and exorcisms, he slows himself down, and his vision is back to seeing ordinary grass. He now throws off the witch, and rides on her back instead. He picks up a piece of log, and beats her. The older woman collapses, and transforms into a beautiful girl with "long, pointy eyelashes".

Later, rumour circulates that a Cossack chief (sotnik)'s daughter was found crawling home, beaten near death, her last wish being for Khoma the seminary student to come pray for her at her deathbed, and for three successive nights after she dies.

Khoma learns of this from the seminary's rector who orders him to go. Khoma wants to flee, but the bribed rector is in league with the Cossack henchmen, who are already waiting with the kibitka wagon to transport him.

At the Cossack community

The Cossack chief Yavtukh (nicknamed Kovtun) explains that his daughter expired before she finished revealing how she knew Khoma; at any rate he swears horrible vengeance upon her killer. Khoma turns sympathetic, and swears to discharge his duty (hoping for a handsome reward), but the daughter killed turns out to be the witch he had fatally beaten.

The Cossacks start relating stories about comrades, revealing all sorts of terrible exploits by the chief's daughter, whom they know is a witch. One comrade was charmed by her, ridden like a horse, and did not survive long; another had his infant child's blood sucked out at the throat, and his wife killed by the blue necrotic witch who growled like a dog. Inexhaustible episodes about the witch-daughter follow.

The first night, Khoma is escorted to the gloomy church to hold vigil alone with the girl's body. Just as he wonders if it may come alive, the girl is reanimated and walks towards him. Frightened, Khoma draws a magic circle of protection around himself, and she is unable to cross the line. She turns cadaverously blue, and reenters her coffin making it fly around wildly, but the barrier holds until the rooster crows.

The next night, he draws the magic circle again and recites prayer, which render him invisible, and she is seen clawing at empty space. The witch summons unseen, winged demons and monsters, that bang and rattle and screech at the windows and door from the outside, trying to enter. He endures until the rooster's crow. He is brought back, and the people notice half his hair had turned gray.

Khoma's attempted escape into the brambles fails. The third and most terrifying night, the winged "unclean powers" ( nechistaya sila) are all audibly darting around him, and the witch-corpse calls on these spirits to bring the Viy, the one who can see everything. The squat Viy is hairy with an iron face, bespattered all over with black earth, its limbs like fibrous roots. The Viy orders its long-dangling eyelids reaching the floor to be lifted so it can see. Khoma, despite his warning instinct, cannot resist the temptation to watch. The Viy is able to see Khoma's whereabouts, the spirits all attack, and Khoma falls dead. The cock crows, but this is already its second morning call, and the "gnomes" who are unable to flee get trapped forever in the church, which eventually becomes overgrown by weeds and trees.

The story ends with Khoma's two friends commenting on his death and how it was his lot in life to die in such a way, agreeing that if his courage held he would have survived.

Analysis 
Scholars attempting to identify elements from folklore tradition represents perhaps the largest group.

Others seek to reconstruct how Gogol may have put together the pieces from (Russian translations of) European literary works. There is also a contingent of religious interpretation present, but also a considerable number of scholars delving in psychology-based interpretation, Freudian and Jungian.

Folkloric sources 
Among scholars delving into the folkloric aspects of the novella, Viktor P. Petrov tries to match individual motifs in the plot with folktales from Afanasyev's collection or elsewhere.

Viacheslav V. Ivanov's studies concentrate on the Viy creature named in the title, and the themes of death and vision associated around it; Ivanov also undertakes a broader comparative analysis which references non-Slavic traditions as well.

Hans-Jörg Uther classified the story of "Viy", by Gogol, as Aarne–Thompson–Uther tale type ATU 307, "The Princess in the Coffin".

The witch 

The Malorussian folktale translated as "The Soldier's Midnight Watch", set in Kiev, was identified as a parallel in this respect by its translator, W. R. S. Ralston (1873); it was taken from  Afanasyev's collection and the Russian original bore no special title, except "Stories about Witches", variant c.

A listing of a number of folktales exhibiting parallels on this, as well as other motifs, was given by Viktor Petrov (pen names V. Domontovych) and paraphrase of it can be found in Frederik C. Driessen's study (avail. in English translation).

Viy 
Viy was the name given to the "chief of the gnomes" (nachál'nik gnómov) by the "Little Russians", or so Gogol has insisted in his author's note.

However, given that the gnome is not a part of native Ukrainian folklore, or of Eastern Slavonic lore in general, the viy has come to be considered a product of Gogol's own imagination rather than folklore.

The fact that viy itself shows little sign of existing in the region's folklore record is an additional plain reason for the skepticism. Thus, Gogol's contrivance of the viy is the consensus opinion of other modern commentators also, who refer to the viy as a literary device, and so forth.

In the past, the viy creature had been an assumed part of genuine Malorussian (Ukrainian) lore. For instance, Scottish folklorist Charlotte Dempster mentions the "vie" of Little Russia in passing, and floats the idea of the phonetic similarity to the vough or vaugh of the Scottish Highlands. Ralston suggested Viy was known to the Serbians, but clarification as to any attestation is wanting.

There is a tantalizing claim that a Gogol acquaintance Aleksandra Osipovna Rosset (later Smirnova) wrote c. 1830 that she heard from a nurse, but this informant's reliability has been questioned, as well as her actual authorship at such a date, So the story was probably something Smirnova had heard or read from Gogol, but reshuffled as a remote past memory.

Heavy eyebrow motif 
The witch's husband in the Russian folk tale "Ivan Bykovich (Ivan the Bull's Son)", needed to have his eyebrows and eyelashes lifted with a "pitchfork". The aforementioned Viacheslav V. Ivanov (1971) is credited, in modern times, with drawing the parallel between Gogol's viy and the witch's husband, called the "old, old man" or "Old Oldster" (staryĭ starik). However, this was perhaps anticipated by Ralston, who stated that the witch-husband ("Aged One") bore physical resemblance to what, he claimed, the Serbians called a "Vy", though he did not address resemblance with Gogol's viy directly.

There also exists an old folk tradition surrounding St. Cassian the Unmerciful, who was said in some tales to have eyebrows that descended to his knees and which were raised only on Leap Year.

Psychological interpretations 
Hugh McLean (Slavicist) (1958) is a noted example of a psychological study of this novella; he identifies the running motif of sexual fulfillment resulting in punishment in this Gogol collection, so that when the student Khoma engages in the ride of the witch,  "an obviously sexual act", death is meted out as punishment. A supplementary understanding of this schema using Lacanian analysis is undertaken by Romanchuk (2009), where Khoma's resistance using prayer is an enactment of his perversion, defined as Perversion is "a wish for a father's Law that reveals its absence". McLean's analysis was poorly received by Soviet scholars at the time.

Psychoanalysis
Due to the psychosexual nature of the central plot, namely Khoma's killing of the witch and her subsequent transformation into a beautiful girl, the novella has become open to various psychoanalytical (Freudian) interpretations, thus the attempt by some, to interpret Khoma's strife with the witch in terms of Oedipal desires and carnal relations with the mother.

Viy was proclaimed "the image of an inexorable father who comes to avenge his son's incest", in a comment near the end given without underlying reasoning, by Driessen (1965) This was modified to "a condensation of the [witch] who was ravished by [Khoma] Brut and the sotnik/father who has vowed to take revenge against the ravisher of his daughter" by Rancour-Laferriere (1978), though Rancour-Laferriere's approach has been characterized as "an interesting extreme" elsewhere.

Vision

Leon Stilman  has stayed clear of such psychoanalytic interpretations, and opted to take the eye motif as symbolic of Gogol's own quest for gaining visionary power (an "absolute vision" or "all-seeing eye"). However, his study is still characterized as "psychosexual" in some quarters.

Viy and the witch's eye

The close relationship between the witch and the Viy has been suggested, based on the similarity of her long-eyelashes with the Viy's long-eyelids. And the Ukrainian word viy glossed as 'eyelid' incorrectly, has been connected with a hypothetical viya or viia meaning 'eyelash'.
 
Further proposed etymology entwines connection with the word vuy (Ukr. 'maternal uncle'), suggested by  This establishes the blood relationship between the two for some commentators.

Adaptations 
 Viy (1909 film), silent film adaptation by Vasily Goncharov. The film is lost. 
 Viy (1967 film), a faithful Soviet adaptation by Georgi Kropachyov, Konstantin Yershov, and Aleksandr Ptushko.
 A Holy Place (1990 film), a Serbian (Yugoslav) horror film based on the story.
 Viy (1996 animated short) ‘Вій’ by Leonid Zarubin, Alla Grachyova
 The Power of Fear (2006 film), a Russian horror film very loosely based on the story.
 Evil Spirit; VIY (2008 film), a South Korean horror film by Park Jin-seong based on the story.
 Viy (2014 film), internationally known as Forbidden Empire, and in the UK as Forbidden Kingdom. A Russian dark fantasy film by Oleg Stepchenko very loosely based on the story. A young, British map maker stumbles onto a rural Transylvanian town steeped in the myth.
 Gogol. Viy, 2018 film, serialized for TV as Gogol (film series); Viy is episode 6

Several other works draw on the short story:
 Mario Bava's film Black Sunday is loosely based on "Viy".
 In the 1978 film Piranha, a camp counselor retells Viy's climactic identification of Khoma as a ghost story.
 Russian heavy metal band Korrozia Metalla are believed to have recorded a demo tape in 1982 titled Vii, however, nothing about the tape has surfaced.
 In the adventure-platformer video game La-Mulana, Viy serves as the boss of the Inferno Cavern area.
 In Catherynne M. Valente's novel Deathless, Viy is the Tsar of Death, a Grim Reaper-like figure who embodies gloom and decay in Russia.
 In the mobile game Fate/Grand Order, Viy appears as Anastasia Nikolaevna's familiar and the source of her powers.

See also 
 Rusalka

Explanatory notes

Citations 
Footnotes

References

  
  
 
 
 
 
 ; Reprinted p. 151ff in van der Eng & Grygar edd. (2018) Structure of Texts and Semiotics of Culture.
 
 Kent, Leonard J "The Collected Tales and Plays of Nikolai Gogol." Toronto: Random House of Canada Limited. 1969. Print.
 Krys, Svitlana, “Intertextual Parallels Between Gogol' and Hoffmann: A Case Study of Vij and The Devil’s Elixirs.” Canadian-American Slavic Studies (CASS) 47.1 (2013): 1-20.
 
 
  
 Putney, Christopher. "Russian Devils and Diabolical Conditionality in Nikolai Gogol's Evenings on a farm near Dikanka." New York: Peter Lang Publishing, Inc. 1999. Print.

External links 
 

Short stories by Nikolai Gogol
Horror short stories
1835 short stories
Vampires in written fiction
Demons in written fiction
Short stories about Cossacks
Short stories set in the Russian Empire
Gothic short stories
Short stories adapted into films
ATU 300-399
Speculative fiction novellas
Kyiv in fiction
Witchcraft in written fiction